The Captain Kottas Museum or Museum of the Macedonian Struggle of Captain Kottas is located in the village of Kottas, Macedonia, Greece, the birthplace of the Greek Slavic-speaking Captain Kottas (Greek: Κωνσταντίνος Χρήστου), one of the earliest protagonists of the Greek Struggle for Macedonia.



Exhibits
On the National Road that connects Florina with Korytsa in Albania and at a distance of 45 km from the first is the village of Kottas, home of the local Macedonian of the same name.

On the ground floor there is a display of three complete outfits belonging to the Kottas family, as well as a few domestic utensils and tools. Two firearms dating from the time of the Macedonian Struggle are exhibited on the first floor, and photographs of Macedonian fighters from the Florina area.

History
Konstantinos Christou (Kottas) in collaboration with the metropolitan of Kastoria Germanos Karavangelis fought with his body against the Bulgarian komitatjis before 1904, with the result that there was Greek activity in the area of Korestia until Pavlos Melas and the other Greek chiefs came from the south mainland of Greece and Crete.

The Ministry of Macedonia and Thrace made provision for the Kottas family home to be converted into a museum, and it was opened by the then President of Greece late in 1995. It operates with the help of the "Friends of the Museum of the Macedonian Struggle society" and co-operating women's societies.

References

Citations

Sources
 

Buildings and structures in Florina (regional unit)
Macedonian Struggle
Biographical museums in Greece
1995 establishments in Greece
Museums in Western Macedonia
Museums established in 1995
Museums in Greece